Waxholms Ångfartygs AB, commonly referred to as Waxholmsbolaget, is a shipping company owned by Stockholm county council and is responsible for the seaborne public transport in the Stockholm archipelago and Stockholm harbour. The company, which is mostly tax-funded, carried about 4.3 million travellers in 2003, covering a region from Arholma in north of the archipelago to Landsort in the south.

The company owns 20 archipelago boats, and four boats for the inner-city Djurgården ferry line. The operation of the ships is handled by several contractors, some of whom also operate their own ships on behalf of Waxholmsbolaget.

History

The origins of the company lie in the Djurgårdens Ångbåts-Aktie-Bolag, which was established in 1849. The company operated a steamboat service to the Stockholm archipelago, using the paddle steamers Ran and Aegir on routes from Stockholm to Vaxholm and Dalarö. The new steamboats answered a demand for travel to and from the archipelago, both from affluent Stockholmer’s building summer villas on outlying islands, but also from archipelago residents who travelled into the city to sell fish and vegetables at the market.

In 1869 the company was transformed into the Waxholms Ångfartygs Aktiebolag, which came to be popularly known as the Waxholmsbolaget. Shares were issued in the new company, and a new propeller powered steamboat, the Fredriksborg, was built. In 1881, the Waxholm joined the fleet, establishing the design of what became the typical archipelago steamer. However, in 1898, dissatisfaction with the services provided by the Waxholms Ångfartygs Aktiebolag led to the foundation of a competitor, the Stockholm - Vaxholms Rederi AB. In 1901, the two companies merged to form a new company, the Waxholms Nya Ångfartygs AB, which continued to be popularly known as the Waxholmsbolaget.

In 1913, the Enskilda Bank took over the running of the Waxholmsbolaget, in order to expand operations and offer a better service throughout the archipelago. In 1946, Rederi Svea became the majority shareholder.

In 1964, the company was renamed as Waxholms Ångfartygs AB, under the ownership of the Vaxholm Municipality. Three years later, in 1967, ownership was transferred to a joint body of the City of Stockholm and County of Stockholm. In 1971, with the incorporation of the city into the county, ownership moved to Stockholm County Council.

In 1970, Waxholmsbolaget took over the services and fleet of the  company, which had been founded in 1863. This company operated ferry services within Stockholm city and the inner archipelago, including the Djurgården ferries.

Current fleet
The current fleet owned by the Waxholmsbolaget comprises three classic vessels, nine ice-strengthened ferries, eight fast ferries and four ferries for the urban Djurgården ferry service.

Classic ferries

Ice-strengthened ferries

Fast ferries

Djurgården ferries 
See article Djurgården ferry

Notable past fleet

The following notable vessels were formerly part of the Waxholmsbolaget fleet:
 Angantyr (between 1968 and 1978)
 Express I (as the Express, between 1900 and 1913; as the Express I, between 1913 and 1960)
 Fredriksborg (between 1869 and 1882; now the Katarina)
 Östanå I (between 1913 and 1957)
 Östanå II (between 1913 and 1951)
 Saxaren (between 1929 and 1964; now the Gustafsberg VII)
 Valkyrian (between 1918 and 1964, now the Drottningholm)
 Waxholm (between 1881 and 1956)
 Waxholm (as the Express II, between 1913 and 1964; as the Waxholm, between 1964 and 1978)

References

External links
 
 

Transport in Stockholm County
Transport in Stockholm
Stockholm archipelago
Swedish companies established in 1849